"A Fistful of Meg" is the fourth episode of the twelfth season and the 214th overall episode of the animated comedy series Family Guy. It aired on Fox in the United States and Canada on November 10, 2013, and is written by Dominic Bianchi and Joe Vaux and directed by Joe Vaux. In the episode, Meg tries to get out of a fight with a tough bully while Brian retaliates against Peter for posing naked. The episode was made to reference 1987 teen comedy film Three O'Clock High.

Plot

At school, Meg hears about a new student named Mike Pulaski from her friends, mentioning that he is an unstable bully, which Meg gets to see firsthand when he turns Neil Goldman into a balloon animal and pops him. While in the cafeteria with her friends, Meg accidentally spills her lunch on Mike, leading him to threaten her with a showdown at 3:00 P.M. on Friday after school. Meg unsuccessfully tries to get out of the fight first by asking Lois to transfer her to another school. The school in mind is too expensive. The next day at school, Principal Shepherd announces on the PA that he is accepting bets on who will win the showdown. For her second attempt to get out of the fight, Meg intentionally releases a sex tape in an attempt to get expelled from school. It is only watched by Stewie. Finally, Meg pays four of the toughest jocks in school to beat up Mike for $1,000. Mike grievously beats them all and writes "You're next, Meg!" on a hallway wall in their blood. Meg goes crying to the bathroom where her friends decide to abandon her for their own safety. While crying, Quagmire calls her into one of the stalls that serve as his "base of operations" and admits to Meg that he had been bullied by a girl named Tracey Bellings as a teenager over preferring RC Cola during the cola wars. She then forced him into a long and sexually abusive relationship. His reasons for helping Meg is because he never stood up to his bully, and doesn't want Meg to go through the same thing. After extensive training with Quagmire, Meg faces Mike at school on Friday. Initially getting beaten up where some of the punches to Meg's face causes it to switch between her normal face (which is considered the ugly one) and the beautiful face, Meg decides to kiss Mike grossing him out. Meg then further grosses him out by popping a pimple onto him before finally lifting up her shirt in front of Mike, while everyone else looks away. Mike, however, does not look away, and is gruesomely melted, similar to what happened to Major Toht in Raiders of the Lost Ark. Although Quagmire tells Meg that she will be alive to tell the story for a "long time," Meg reveals in a narration that she dies a year later from septic shock due to her body reacting to a frozen hot dog.

Meanwhile, Peter casually starts taking his clothes off in front of Brian while talking to him about the Three Little Pigs as he sometimes prefers sleeping nude. Brian is disgusted by it, although Peter points out that Brian himself is typically nude, and claims that everyone undresses in front of their dogs. After another encounter with Brian in the bathroom nude after he has just finished showering, Peter realizes that Brian doesn't like to see him nude and starts harassing him in the nude including using Lois in a bait-and-switch tactic and even cutting off his own penis and mailing it to Brian in a package (though Peter collapsed from blood loss). At Stewie's suggestion, Brian decides to shave all of his fur off to give Peter a taste of his own medicine. After falling into Brian's trap, Peter is shocked at seeing Brian hairless, wrinkled, and with six nipples. Brian is very affectionate to Peter, scaring him even when he asks why Brian has six nipples. Too scared by what he has seen, Peter agrees to wear clothes at all times in front of Brian, having learnt his lesson the hard way. Although Stewie's idea worked, Brian's fur won't grow back for three months. In the meantime, Stewie allows him to wear a pair of his own clothes in the interim to keep warm.

Reception
Eric Thurm of The A.V. Club gave the episode a D, criticizing the running theme of the show making fun of Meg as "distasteful," specifically taking issue with the episode's jokes as unfunny beyond a typical Family Guy offensiveness. Thurm commented positively on the side story between Brian and Peter, but opined that the latter was ultimately overshadowed by the jokes at Meg's expense.

On November 15, 2013, five days after the episode's airdate, the Parents Television Council filed an indecency complaint to the FCC, alleging that the episode jokes about child molestation, exploitation, rape, the sexualized use of food and the perverse 'internal defrosting' of frozen hot dogs, and the overall theme of the episode about a boy bullying and beating up a girl, violated the FCC's indecency guidelines.

The episode received a 2.0 rating and was watched by a total of 4.18 million people, this made it the second most watched show on Animation Domination that night beating American Dad! and Bob's Burgers but losing to The Simpsons with 4.20 million.

References

External links 
 

Family Guy (season 12) episodes
2013 American television episodes
Television episodes about bullying